Brian O'Grady (born May 17, 1992) is an American professional baseball center fielder and first baseman for the Hanwha Eagles of the KBO League. He has played in Major League Baseball (MLB) for the Cincinnati Reds, Tampa Bay Rays and San Diego Padres and in the Nippon Professional Baseball (NPB) for the Saitama Seibu Lions.

Career
O'Grady attended Archbishop Wood Catholic High School in Warminster Township, Pennsylvania. He attended Rutgers University and played college baseball for the Scarlet Knights. O'Grady was drafted by the Cincinnati Reds in the eighth round, with the 245th overall selection, of the 2014 Major League Baseball draft.

Cincinnati Reds
O'Grady played for the Billings Mustangs in 2014, hitting .257.354/.449/.803 with 6 home runs and 42 RBI. He split the 2015 season between the Dayton Dragons and the Daytona Tortugas, hitting a combined .249/.360/.411/.771 with 11 home runs and 54 RBI. He returned to Daytona for the 2016 season, hitting .235/.363/.394/.757 with 9 home runs and 40 RBI. He split the 2017 season between Daytona and the Pensacola Blue Wahoos, hitting a combined .185/.313/.347/.660 with 8 home runs and 27 RBI. He split the 2018 season between Pensacola and the Louisville Bats, hitting a combined .280/.358/.512/.870 with 14 home runs and 59 RBI. He returned to Louisville to open the 2019 season.

On August 5, 2019, the Reds selected O'Grady's contract and promoted him to the major leagues. He made his debut on August 8 versus the Chicago Cubs. O'Grady was designated for assignment on November 25, 2019.

Tampa Bay Rays
On November 27, 2019, O'Grady was traded to the Tampa Bay Rays in exchange for cash considerations and a PTBNL. On August 29, 2020, O'Grady was recalled to the active roster. On November 20, 2020, O'Grady was designated for assignment.

San Diego Padres
On December 8, 2020, O'Grady signed a major league contract with the San Diego Padres.
O'Grady played in 32 games for the Padres in 2021, hitting .157 with 2 home runs and 9 RBI's. On October 30, 2021, O'Grady was outrighted off of the 40-man roster. He became a free agent following the season.

Saitama Seibu Lions
On November 26, 2021, O'Grady signed with the Saitama Seibu Lions of Nippon Professional Baseball. He hit .213 with 15 home runs and 46 RBI over 123 games in 2022.

Hanwha Eagles
On December 20, 2022, O’Grady signed a one-year contract with the Hanwha Eagles of the KBO League.

References

External links

1992 births
Living people
People from Warminster, Pennsylvania
Baseball players from Pennsylvania
Major League Baseball first basemen
Major League Baseball outfielders
Nippon Professional Baseball outfielders
Cincinnati Reds players
Tampa Bay Rays players
San Diego Padres players
Saitama Seibu Lions players
Rutgers Scarlet Knights baseball players
Billings Mustangs players
Dayton Dragons players
Daytona Tortugas players
Peoria Javelinas players
Pensacola Blue Wahoos players
Louisville Bats players
Águilas de Mexicali players
Estrellas Orientales players
Águilas Cibaeñas players
American expatriate baseball players in the Dominican Republic
American expatriate baseball players in Japan
American expatriate baseball players in Mexico